This is a list of the extreme points of Belarus, the points that are farther north, south, east or west than any other location.

Latitude and longitude 

 North: Verkhnyadzvinsk District, Vitebsk Region
 South: Brahin District, Gomel Region
 West: Kamenets District, Brest Region
 East: Khotsimsk District, Mogilev Region

Altitude 
 Maximum : Dzyarzhynskaya Hara, 345 m
 Minimum : Nyoman River, 90 m

See also 

Extreme points of Earth
Geography of Belarus

References

Geography of Belarus
Lists of coordinates
Belarus
Extreme